Physalaemus erythros is a species of frog in the family Leptodactylidae.
It is endemic to Brazil.
Its natural habitats are subtropical or tropical moist shrubland, subtropical or tropical high-altitude grassland, intermittent freshwater marshes, and rocky areas.
It is threatened by habitat loss.

References

erythros
Endemic fauna of Brazil
Taxonomy articles created by Polbot
Amphibians described in 2003